is a Japanese  manga series written and illustrated by Yonezou Nekota. It is serialized in the monthly manga magazine Magazine Be × Boy since 2006.

Don't Be Cruel originally had a limited run as a series of short stories in 2006. After publishing several dōjinshi and Don't Be Cruel: Plus+ in the magazine B-Boy Cube, Nekota decided to resume the series in 2010. Over the run of the series, several drama CD adaptations have been released, and by 2018, 1.4 million physical copies of the series have been sold.

Plot

Takashi Nemugasa is a student at an elite high school, but he is at risk of losing his scholarship due to his grades. He decides to cheat on his test, but he is caught by the school's womanizing playboy, Hideyuki Maya, who blackmails him into having a sexual relationship in exchange for not reporting him. Over time, Maya discovers he is attracted to Nemugasa and does his best to support him, while Nemugasa slowly realizes that he may return Maya's feelings for him as well.

Characters

Nemugasa is an honor student with a conservative, strict upbringing.

Maya is Nemugasa's classmate, who is reputed to be a delinquent and is popular at school for his womanizing ways. When he blackmails Nemugasa, he realizes he is genuinely in love with him and becomes more mature about their relationship and his image.

Akira is Maya's cousin and tutor. He is protective of Maya and initially antagonizes Nemugasa, but later becomes a source of advice for the two. He is jaded after his high school teacher rejected him, but he finds support through Shimakawa.

Shimakawa is a 5th year medical student in college who is infamous for being a womanizer, but he falls love with Akira and patiently waits for him to return his feelings.

Ruka is Maya's senior in college.

Okino is a boy who Nemugasa befriends when they enter college. Okino identifies as gay and openly dreams of getting a boyfriend, believing Maya to be his ideal man.

Jutta is Akira's younger brother. He sabotages Sanada and Akira's relationship out of possessiveness for Akira.

Sanada is Akira and Jutta's high school teacher. Despite his feelings for Akira, he rejects him to protect his future.

Media

Manga

Originally titled Treat Me Gently, Please in Japan, the manga is written and illustrated by Yonezou Nekota. It was serialized in monthly manga magazine Magazine Be × Boy since 2006. The chapters were later released in 9 bound volume by Libre under the Be × Boy Comics imprint.

Nekota had originally published Don't Be Cruel in 2006 as a short story, which became the title work of an anthology that was published with several other unrelated short stories. Following the release of the book, Nekota then self-published several short sequels as dōjinshi, which were sold exclusively at Comiket. Afterwards, she published Don't Be Cruel: Plus+ in the March 2010 issue of B-Boy Cube and later decided to continue the main story. The first volume was reprinted with a new cover illustration in 2016. The dōjinshi were compiled and published in the volume version of Don't Be Cruel: Plus+.

Throughout the series' run, Frontier Works published a series of audio drama CDs. The first drama CD was released on October 22, 2008 and charted #219 on the Oricon Weekly Albums Chart. The second drama CD was released on December 24, 2014 and charted #154 on the Oricon Weekly Albums Chart. The third drama CD was released on November 28, 2018, with a special track included in the first press limited edition. The fourth drama CD was released on December 21, 2018.

In 2016, Viz Media licensed the series for North American distribution in English under their SuBLime imprint with the title Don't Be Cruel. The first four volumes were published as two 2-in-1 omnibus.

Side stories

Dōjinshi

Under the pseudonym "Komeya", Nekota has also self-published unofficial dōjinshi of the series and sold limited copies exclusively at Comiket. The Don't Be Gentle short stories were later compiled and officially released in Don't Be Cruel: Plus+.

Reception

By August 2018, the series had sold a cumulative total of 1.4 million physical copies in Japan.

Rebecca Silverman from Anime News Network praised the story and artwork, but noted that the first two volumes bundled in the English omnibus were different in tone, with the first volume opening with non-consensual tropes while the second focusing on more emotional romance. Silverman also reviewed the story and artwork in Akira Takanashi's Story favorably, but felt uncomfortable with Jutta's non-consensual parts.

Notes

References

External links
 
 
 

Japanese radio dramas
LGBT in anime and manga
SuBLime manga
Yaoi anime and manga
2000s LGBT literature